Blossom is the second studio album by German folk group Milky Chance. It was released worldwide on 17 March 2017 and is the first album with guitarist Antonio Greger. The album is supported by the lead single "Cocoon".

Track listing

Charts

References

2017 albums
Milky Chance albums